The EATP 22 is a Belgian trailerable sailboat that was designed by E. G. van de Stadt as a cruiser and first built in 1974.

Production
The design was the first boat built by ETAP Yachting in Belgium. It was built between 1974 and 1984, with 1830 boats completed, but it is now out of production.

Design
The EATP 22 is a recreational keelboat, built predominantly of glassfibre and features a flush deck design. It has a fractional sloop rig, a raked stem, a plumb transom, a transom-hung rudder controlled by a tiller and a lifting keel or optional centreboard. It displaces  and carries  of ballast.

For downwind sailing the design may be equipped with a spinnaker.

Operational history
The boat was at one time supported by a class club, the ETAP Owners Association.

See also
List of sailing boat types

References

External links
Video: sailing an ETAP 22

Keelboats
1970s sailboat type designs
Sailing yachts
Trailer sailers
Sailboat type designs by E. G. van de Stadt
Sailboat types built by ETAP Yachting